On November 30, 2018, George H. W. Bush, the 41st president of the United States, died from vascular Parkinson's disease at his home in Houston, Texas. Bush was the first former U.S. president to die in nearly 12 years since Gerald Ford in late 2006.

Shortly after news broke of Bush's death, President Donald Trump declared a national day of mourning and ordered all flags "throughout the United States and its Territories and possessions" lowered to half staff for 30 days after his death. The state funeral of George H. W. Bush was the official funerary rites conducted by the Government of the United States which occurred over a period of four days from December 3 to 6, 2018. About a dozen world leaders attended the event.

Background
Bush had incurred a series of health problems in his final years. In 2012, he was diagnosed with vascular Parkinsonism, necessitating the use of a mobility scooter, limiting his speech and his ability to travel across the world (due to this, he did not participate at the memorial service of Nelson Mandela in 2013, opting to send a message of condolence to Mandela's family and watch the event on television instead). He was hospitalized numerous times in serious condition, most notably missing the inauguration of Donald Trump due to being in the intensive care unit at Houston Methodist Hospital.

Following the death of his wife Barbara on April 17, 2018, Bush continued to deal with a variety of health issues. He was hospitalized a day after her funeral in critical condition with sepsis, but he was eventually stabilized and released. In May, a month before his 94th birthday, he was briefly admitted to a hospital in Maine due to low blood pressure. Released after about two weeks, he returned to Houston.

In late November, Bush's health began to decline again. He received former president Barack Obama at his home for what was described as a "private visit" on November 27. By November 28, he had stopped eating and did not leave his bed, telling his medical staff he did not want to return to the hospital. James Baker, former Secretary of State and a longtime friend of Bush, reported that Bush's condition had improved by the morning of November 30, as he had begun eating again and was able to sit up from his bed and converse with others. According to Baker, Bush's last meal consisted of three soft-boiled eggs, a cup of yogurt, and two fruit drinks.

By that evening, however, his health again worsened and death was imminent. Irish tenor Ronan Tynan came and sang two songs for Bush, as his family and friends gathered at the household or were placed on speakerphone calls to say their goodbyes. Bush's son, former president George W. Bush, called from his home in Dallas and told his father that he loved him; the elder Bush replied "I love you, too", which were his last words. Shortly after that conversation, Bush died at 10:10 p.m. Central Standard Time. Baker described the death as "peaceful", adding "If those things could be sweet, it was sweet".

Within hours of his death, the former president's office issued a statement indicating that funeral arrangements would be announced "as soon as practical". The exact cause of death was not immediately announced.

Reactions
At 12:49 a.m. EST on December 1, President Donald Trump tweeted that he and Melania Trump's "hearts ache with his loss and we, with the entire American people, send our prayers to the entire Bush family". Former president Barack Obama said in a statement that "George H. W. Bush's life is a testament to the notion that public service is a noble, joyous calling. And he did tremendous good along the journey." Former president Bill Clinton sent a statement that "Hillary and I mourn the passing of President George H.W. Bush, and give thanks for his great long life of service, love, and friendship. I will be forever grateful for the friendship we formed. From the moment I met him as a young governor invited to his home in Kennebunkport, I was struck by the kindness he showed to Chelsea, by his innate genuine decency, and by his devotion to Barbara, his children, and their growing brood." Former president Jimmy Carter mourned his death on Saturday, saying his administration was "marked by grace, civility, and social conscience." Former Vice President Dan Quayle, who served with Bush, said that "the world mourns the loss of a great American" and that he had often told his children to look to Bush as a role model. Former Vice President Al Gore issued a statement calling Bush a "man of integrity". Sylvester Turner, the mayor of Houston – where Bush resided at the time of his death – said that he joined "Houstonians in mourning the death of George Herbert Walker Bush and expressing heartfelt condolences to his children and the rest of the Bush family".

Initial activities

Gun salutes and memorial musters
U.S. Army Regulation 600–25 provides that United States Army posts are to fire continuous artillery volleys at 30-minute intervals from sunrise to sunset the day after official notice is received of the death of a former president of the United States. As also provided for by regulation, the corps of cadets of the United States Military Academy are to be immediately assembled to be officially informed of the death by the superintendent.

National mourning
At mid-morning on December 1, President Donald Trump proclaimed December 5 to be a national day of mourning. The proclamation further decreed that American flags "on all public buildings and grounds, at all military posts and naval stations, and on all naval vessels of the Federal Government in the District of Columbia and throughout the United States and its Territories and possessions" be lowered to half staff until December 30, 2018. In addition, all agencies of the United States Government throughout the United States were ordered closed on the day of mourning and the Supreme Court of the United States announced it would postpone hearing oral arguments in Gamble v. United States which had been previously scheduled for that day.

The United States Postal Service suspended regular mail deliveries, retail services and administrative office activity on December 5 as part of the national day of mourning although there was limited package delivery to avoid any setbacks for the Holiday season. All of the United States' principal financial exchanges – including the New York Stock Exchange and NASDAQ – suspended trading for the duration of the day of mourning.

Foreign observances
The Government of the United Kingdom issued instructions that all government offices in the United Kingdom were to lower the Union flag to half-mast on December 1, 2018. In Canada, flags on all federal buildings were ordered flown at half-mast on December 5.

On December 1 the Kuwait Towers displayed images of Bush in honor of his vital role in the Gulf War.

The President of the Republic of Kosovo Hashim Thaçi announced on December 5 the day of national mourning with the flags half-masted.

Informal observances
Two hours following the death of Bush, approximately 100 students at Texas A&M University gathered at the George H.W. Bush Presidential Library and Museum and proceeded to a nearby statue of Bush to pay respects. Later that day, on an overlook near the Bush Compound in Maine, people spontaneously gathered to lay flowers, among them including former University of Massachusetts president Jack M. Wilson. A makeshift memorial of flowers, flags, and cards was also created by members of the public outside the gates of Bush's Houston home.

The Dole Institute of Politics at the University of Kansas announced on December 1 that it would immediately lay out a book of condolence for members of the public to sign. Also on December 1, the city of Houston announced it would hold a memorial service in honor of Bush on the evening of December 3, 2018, at Hermann Square in front of the Houston City Hall with the Houston Symphony scheduled to provide music.

Moments of silence were observed at sporting events in the weeks following George H.W. Bush's death, including prior to the December 3 NFL game between the Washington Redskins and Philadelphia Eagles at Lincoln Financial Field, and before the December 9 Army-Navy Game, among others.

State funeral

Planning
Prior to his death, Bush filed a 211-page document with the Military District of Washington, which contains a request for an aerial flyover of fighter jets in missing man formation by the United States Air Force during his state funeral as well as final interment and burial to occur at the George H.W. Bush Presidential Library and Museum in College Station, Texas. Bush also indicated that he did not want the presidential fanfare, "Hail to the Chief", to be performed during final interment and burial. In addition, Bush made plans for a national funeral service to be held at Washington National Cathedral in Washington D.C.

Security measures
The Department of Homeland Security designated the Washington phase of the state funeral as a National Special Security Event, as they've done with the state funerals of Ronald Reagan and Gerald Ford, as with other major Washington events since September 11, 2001.

Ceremony
The state funeral, as announced, occurred in three stages.

Air transport of Bush's remains occurred aboard a VC-25, tail number 29000, of the United States Air Force's 89th Airlift Wing operating under the call sign "Special Air Mission 41" (SAM41).

Stage One (Houston, Texas)
On the morning of December 3, 2018, the casket carrying Bush's remains was moved from Geo. H. Lewis & Sons Funeral Home in Houston to a waiting hearse which then proceeded along a specially closed stretch of Interstate 610 to Ellington Field Joint Reserve Base. The hearse was escorted by Houston Police Department motorcycle outriders and arrived on the runway by approximately 11:45 a.m. Central Standard Time.

A brief ceremony was held on the apron for 100 invited guests, among them George P. Bush, prior to the casket's placement on the waiting "Special Air Mission 41" VC-25 which completed take off by 12:10 p.m. Former president George W. Bush accompanied the casket aboard the aircraft, and was joined by the late president Bush's service dog Sully.

Stage Two (Washington, D.C.)
At approximately 3:25 p.m. Eastern Standard Time on December 3, Special Air Mission 41 arrived at Joint Base Andrews. The casket containing Bush's remains was removed from the aircraft as the United States Air Force Band performed "My Country, 'Tis of Thee" and a 21 gun salute was executed by the U.S. Army's Presidential Salute Battery. The casket proceeded through a ramp guard composed of U.S. armed forces personnel into a waiting Cadillac XTS Echelon hearse for transfer to the United States Capitol.

Bush lay in state in the United States Capitol rotunda from the evening of December 3 through the morning of December 5.

On December 5, at approximately 10:00am EST, the casket was transferred from the Capitol rotunda for funeral services at Washington National Cathedral. The officiating clergy included Michael Bruce Curry, Mariann Edgar Budde, Randolph Marshall Hollerith, and Dr. Russell Levenson, Jr. Rosemarie Logan Duncan was the master of ceremonies. Lauren Bush, Ashley Walker Bush, and Jenna Bush Hager were readers. Jan Naylor Cope provided the Intercession. Tributes were made by Jon Meacham, Brian Mulroney, Alan K. Simpson, and George W. Bush.

President Donald Trump and First Lady Melania Trump, former presidents Jimmy Carter, Bill Clinton, George W. Bush (Bush's eldest son), and Barack Obama were all in attendance, along with their respective wives, former first ladies Rosalynn Carter, Hillary Clinton, Laura Bush (Bush's daughter-in-law), and Michelle Obama. Also attending were Vice President Mike Pence and Second Lady Karen Pence, former vice presidents Dan Quayle, Al Gore, Dick Cheney, and Joe Biden (future president), along with former second ladies Marilyn Quayle, Lynne Cheney, and Jill Biden (future first lady). Presidential children in attendance included Lynda Bird Johnson Robb with Chuck Robb, Luci Baines Johnson with Ian Turpin, Tricia Nixon Cox with Edward F. Cox, Susan Ford, Chelsea Clinton, former Florida governor Jeb Bush (Bush's younger son), and Ivanka Trump with Jared Kushner. Then-senator Bill Nelson, New York Governor George Pataki, political adviser to George W. Bush Karl Rove, former Homeland Security Secretary Tom Ridge, Democratic Representatives John Lewis from Georgia and Jim Cooper from Tennessee, Republican Representatives John Culberson from Texas, who represented Bush's old House district, and Mark Meadows from North Carolina along with many other lawmakers attended as well.

Musical tributes were provided by the Armed Forces Chorus, the United States Marine Orchestra, United States Coast Guard Band, Michael W. Smith and Ronan Tynan. The coffin was lifted, turned, and borne out of the cathedral to Ralph Vaughan Williams's 1906 hymn For All the Saints, Who From Their Labor Rest (Sine nomine) as five U.S. presidents stood in respect.

After the service, the Washington Ringing Society rang a half-muffled quarter peal of Grandsire Caters to Bush's memory. The hearse carrying Bush arrived at Joint Base Andrews at approximately 2:01pm EST and at 2:09pm EST transferred aboard VC25A 29000 via scissor truck as the Bush family boarded Special Air Mission 41 and took off after 2:26pm EST.

Stage Three (Houston, Texas; Spring, Texas; College Station, Texas)
Bush's remains arrived at Ellington Field at December 5, 4:30 p.m. Central Standard Time where they were greeted by a military escort, transported to St. Martin's Episcopal Church and laid in repose until the following morning. A second funeral service for family and friends was held at 10:00 a.m. Central Standard Time on December 6. Eulogies were delivered by President Bush's friend, former Secretary of State and White House Chief of Staff James Baker and grandson George P. Bush. Clergy participating in the service included church Rector Dr. Russell Levenson, Jr., Bishop of Texas C. Andrew Doyle, and former Bishop of Texas Claude E. Payne. During the service, The Oak Ridge Boys sang "Amazing Grace" and Reba McEntire sang "The Lord's Prayer."

After the church service, the remains were driven by hearse to the Union Pacific Railroad Westfield Auto Facility and transported by special railway funeral car to the George H.W. Bush Presidential Library and Museum for interment. The funeral train was led by Union Pacific 4141, an EMD SD70ACe locomotive painted to honor Bush as the first time the remains of any US president had ever traveled on a funeral train since Dwight Eisenhower in 1969. A guard of honor formed by the Ross Volunteers, the Governor of Texas' military escort, attended the removal of the casket from the funeral train.

During interment, the United States Navy announced it would perform the largest funeral flyover in its history, with what the Navy described as an "unprecedented" 21 F/A-18 Hornets led by Captain Kevin McLaughlin, the commanding officer of Strike Fighter Wing Atlantic whose own aircraft was painted in a special memorial livery. The flyover was known as the "missing man flyover," and featured 21 aircraft in a unique position as an honor to Bush's Navy pilot service during World War II. The interment ceremony was private; it was not filmed, broadcast on television, or streamed online at the advance request of the Bush family. Only the flyover, as well as the 21-gun salute and the performance of "Taps" that happened at the library grounds, were shown instead. Bush's remains were buried on the early morning of December 7 between the graves of his wife Barbara and his daughter Robin.

Throughout the day, all U.S. military posts equipped with artillery fired 21-gun salutes. Meanwhile, the Salute to the Union – 50 successive rounds of artillery fire – was performed by batteries at Fort Sill, Oklahoma, Fort Stewart, Georgia, and Fort Drum, New York at 5:00 p.m., a custom traditionally marking the final interment of a former president.

Pallbearers and honorary pallbearers
As customary, pallbearers during each movement of the casket containing Bush's remains were drawn from personnel of the United States Army, United States Navy, United States Air Force, United States Marine Corps, and United States Coast Guard. In addition, honorary pallbearers were selected for most movements of the casket.

Stage 1 honorary pallbearers
Special agents of Bush's former United States Secret Service protective detail served as honorary pallbearers during the movement of the casket from the funeral home in Houston to the hearse that would transport it to Ellington Field.

Stage 2 honorary pallbearers
Sailors drawn from the crew of the United States aircraft carrier  served as honorary pallbearers for the removal of the casket from Special Air Mission 41 at Joint Base Andrews. Captain Sean R. Bailey, the ship's commanding officer at the time of Bush's death, was unable to serve as an honorary pallbearer as the vessel was making final preparations for deployment.

Stage 3 honorary pallbearers
Honorary pallbearers serving during the movement of the casket at points during Stage 3 included Charles F. Hermann (Scowcroft Chair in International Policy Studies at the Bush School of Government and Public Service), 
Amy Sharp (president of the Texas A&M University Student Government Association), and former Texas A&M football coach R.C. Slocum.

Gallery

Dignitaries
International leaders attending these services include:
 Secretary-General of the United Nations António Guterres 
 Charles, Prince of Wales, former prime Minister of the United Kingdom John Major and wife Norma Major
 President of Poland Andrzej Duda, former president Lech Walesa
 President of Kosovo Hashim Thaci
 Chancellor of Germany Angela Merkel
 King of Jordan Abdullah II and Queen Rania of Jordan
 President of the Legislative Yuan Su Jia-chyuan
 Finance Minister Moshe Kahlon
 Governor-General of Australia Peter Cosgrove
 Prince Abdullah bin Hamad bin Isa Al Khalifa
 Former President of Colombia Cesar Gaviria
 Former Minister of Foreign Affairs of France Hubert Vedrine
 Former president of Mexico Carlos Salinas de Gortari
 Former prime minister of Canada Brian Mulroney
 Former prime Minister of Japan Yasuo Fukuda
 Former emir of Qatar Hamad bin Khalifa Al Thani
 Former president of Portugal Aníbal Cavaco Silva
 Former president of Estonia Toomas Hendrik Ilves
 Former prime minister of Kuwait Nasser Al-Mohammed Al-Sabah
 Former premier of Bermuda John Swan

See also

 Death and funeral of Margaret Thatcher
 Death and state funeral of Ronald Reagan
 Death and state funeral of Gerald Ford
 State funerals in the United States

References

External links

Official program for the December 5 memorial service at the National Cathedral (archived file)
Tributes to Bush on the floor of the U.S. Senate, December 4, 2018, C-SPAN

2018 in Houston
2018 in Texas
Articles containing video clips
Bush, George H. W.
Bush, George H. W.
Bush, George H. W.
George H. W. Bush
November 2018 events in the United States
Bush, George H. W.
Bush, George H. W.